Scorching Sands is a 1923 American silent comedy film starring Stan Laurel. The title is a play on that of the 1922 Paramount Pictures film Burning Sands.

Cast

See also
 List of American films of 1923

References

External links

1923 films
American silent short films
American black-and-white films
1923 comedy films
1923 short films
Films directed by Hal Roach
French Foreign Legion in popular culture
Silent American comedy films
American comedy short films
Films about the French Foreign Legion
1920s American films